The Mehlville R-9 School District is a school district based in south unincorporated St. Louis County, Missouri. It serves the communities of Mehlville, Oakville, Concord, and Lemay.

Schools
It operates the following schools:

Early childhood

Mehlville Early Childhood Education, located at John Cary Early Childhood Center in Mehlville and several elementary schools
Early Childhood Special Education
Parents As Teachers

Elementary schools
All MSDR9 elementary schools teach kids from Kindergarten (5-6 y/o) to 5th Grade (10-11 y/o)

Beasley Elementary School 
Beasley was built in the 1960s on grounds that were originally part of the Veterans Administration Hospital at Jefferson Barracks, located in an unincorporated area near southeast Mehlville. The student population is about 300 students. The school mascot is the Jaguar. The school feeds into 2 middle schools; some students go on to Buerkle Middle, some go on to Bernard Middle.

Bierbaum Elementary School 
Bierbaum was built in 1962 and was named after Kermit Bierbaum, a former Mehlville superintendent. The school, located in West Mehlville, is the largest elementary facility in the district with 491 students. The school's mascot is the Buffalo, and feeds into Margaret Buerkle Middle.

Blades Elementary School 
Blades Elementary opened in 1972 in west Oakville, and has a student population of 409. The school mascot is the Bobcat. The school feeds into Bernard Middle.

Forder Elementary School 
Forder Elementary is the only Mehlville School District facility located in Lemay, being first established in the 1930s. The school mascot is the Falcon. 361 students attend Forder, which feeds into Margaret Buerkle Middle.

Hagemann Elementary School 
The modern Hagemann Elementary was built in 1994, but the foundations for the original school were laid as early as 1898. Located in an unincorporated area near Concord, the school mascot is the Hawk, and its 375 students will eventually go on to Washington Middle.

Oakville Elementary School 
Oakville Elementary started as a 3-story building built in 1930. The old building was eventually demolished and a new 1-story building opened in 2004. The school mascot is the Lion and students go on to Bernard Middle. The student population is 368.

Point Elementary School 
Point dates back to 1840, when Mrs. Katherine Burg dedicated a room in her Oakville farmhouse as a classroom. Despite the fact that the school has been rebuilt numerous times, it is said that the bell at the front of the school is preserved from the original building. Around 400 students attend Point. The school mascot is the Eagle, and it feeds into Oakville Middle.

Rogers Elementary School 
Rogers Elementary, located in south Oakville near the confluence of the Mississippi and Meramec Rivers, opened in the fall of 1991 and was named for Dr. Robert E. Rogers, a former superintendent. The school mascot is the Bear, and the 432 students who attend Rogers will go on to Oakville Middle School.

Trautwein Elementary School 
Trautwein opened in 1964. The school is located in Concord, adjacent to Washington Middle, and is home to 382 students. It is named after Henry Trautwein, a former teacher and principal. The school mascot is the Tiger, and the school feeds into the neighboring Washington Middle

Wohlwend Elementary School 
Wohlwend was built in 1969. It is located in Oakville, adjacent to Oakville Middle, and was named after former State Representative Clarence J. Wohlwend. 419 students attend Wohlwend. The school mascot is the Wildcat, and its students go on to Oakville Middle School

MOSAIC 
MOSAIC, located in Mehlville, is the newest school in the district. It opened in 2017, though the building where it is housed opened back in the 19th century as St. John's School. MOSAIC is an acronym for Mehlville and Oakville Students Achieve, Imagine and Create. The school offers "a unique learning experience that allows for increased student choice and personalized learning." Mehlville, however, does not provide transportation for MOSAIC students. The school has a student population of around 250, making it by far the smallest "elementary school" in the district. Students come from all over the district, and because the school has no bus routes, it has no set middle school that MOSAIC feeds into. Students and their parents effectively get to choose which middle school they want to go to, based on where they live in the district and/or based on personal choice.

Middle schools 
Middle schools in the Mehlville R-9 School District teach kids from 6th grade (11-12 y/o) to 8th grade (13-14 y/o).

Every middle school also hosts Academy, a personalized learning program based on STEM/STEAM principles. Most Academy students are MOSAIC alumni, since both programs are very similar experiences.

Bernard Middle School 
Bernard is the newest middle school in the district, opening in 2003. It is located in North Oakville on the same property that once was home to Bernard Elementary School. Both schools are named after Emil Bernard, the first superintendent of the district. The school's mascot is the Patriot, and about 700 students attend, originating from 4 different elementary schools. Bernard feeds into Oakville High School, but a handful of students usually transfer to Mehlville High School

Margaret Buerkle Middle School 
Margaret Buerkle Middle School opened in the fall of 1975. The school is located in Mehlville, and is named after former teacher and administrator Margaret Buerkle. 637 attend MBMS, originating from 3 elementary schools. The school's mascot is the Bobcat and it feeds into Mehlville High School.

Oakville Middle School 
Oakville Middle School opened in 1962 and shares a campus with Wohlwend Elementary.  About 700 students attend the school, originating from 3 elementary schools. The school's mascot is the Spartan and alumni move on to Oakville High School.

Washington Middle School 
Washington Middle School, located in Concord, opened in 1951. It is the oldest middle school in the district and shares a campus with Trautwein Elementary. 458 students are currently enrolled, originating from 2 elementary schools, making Washington the smallest of the four middle schools. Their mascot is the Eagle. A majority of WMS alumni will move on to Mehlville High School, although some usually transfer and attend Oakville High School.

High schools
High schools teach kids from 9th Grade (14-15 y/o) to 12th grade (17-18 y/o)

Both high schools will begin the FLEX program for  the 2022-23 school year, a similar experience to Academy at the middle school
Mehlville High School
Oakville High School
SCOPE/SSLCMS (Alternative School)

Notes

References

External links
Official site

School districts in Missouri
Education in St. Louis County, Missouri
School districts established in 1930